Tessie is the title of both a circa 1902 song that was an early anthem of the Boston Red Sox, and a 2004 song by the punk rock group Dropkick Murphys.

Tessie may also refer to:

 Tessie (given name), a feminine given name or nickname
 Tessie (EP), a 2004 EP by the Dropkick Murphys
 Tessie (film), a 1925 American silent comedy drama film
 Tahoe Tessie, a mythical creature said to dwell in Lake Tahoe, located in Nevada and California

See also
 Tessy (disambiguation)